Nipun Malhotra (born 22 September 1993) is an Indian cricketer. He made his first-class debut for Arunachal Pradesh in the 2018–19 Ranji Trophy on 14 December 2018.

References

External links
 

1993 births
Living people
Indian cricketers
Arunachal Pradesh cricketers
Place of birth missing (living people)